Duan Yingying was the defending champion, but lost in the first round to Arina Rodionova.

Peng Shuai won the title, defeating Nao Hibino in the final, 6–3, 6–2.

Seeds

Draw

Finals

Top half

Bottom half

Qualifying

Seeds

Qualifiers

Lucky loser
  Peangtarn Plipuech

Draw

First qualifier

Second qualifier

Third qualifier

Fourth qualifier

Fifth qualifier

Sixth qualifier

References
Main Draw
Qualifying Draw

Jiangxi International Women's Tennis Open - Women's Singles
2017 Women's Singles